Gichere Gakungu (born 1 January 1942) is a Kenyan boxer. He competed in the men's welterweight event at the 1964 Summer Olympics.

References

1942 births
Living people
Kenyan male boxers
Olympic boxers of Kenya
Boxers at the 1964 Summer Olympics
Place of birth missing (living people)
Welterweight boxers